Diamonds & Dirt is the fifth studio album by American singer-songwriter Rodney Crowell, released in 1988. His fifth studio album, it was his second release for Columbia Records. The album was his most successful, achieving RIAA gold certification. All five of its singles reached Number One on the Billboard country charts, setting a record for the most Number One hits from a country album. In order of release, they were "It's Such a Small World" (a duet with then-wife Rosanne Cash), "I Couldn't Leave You If I Tried", "She's Crazy for Leavin", "After All This Time", and a cover of Buck Owens' "Above and Beyond (The Call of Love)".

The album was reissued by Columbia Legacy, with three bonus tracks.

Production
Diamonds & Dirt was Crowell's first album recorded entirely in Nashville and the first aimed squarely at a country audience. It was produced by Tony Brown and Crowell.

Critical reception
The Rolling Stone Album Guide called the album "a stirring treatise on the quest for understanding and balance in a relationship." No Depression wrote that the songs are "played by a band that, in its day, rivaled the Desert Rose Band and Dwight Yoakam’s backing unit as the tightest pseudo-honky-tonkers in country music." Reviewing the reissue, The A.V. Club wrote that the album "still sounds pretty good ... especially in light of the sort of unnatural, reverb-laden late-'80s production that makes everything go 'poof'." Spin deemed it "a traditional country record [on which Crowell] ends ups rocking harder than ever before."

Track listing
All songs written by Rodney Crowell except where noted.
"Crazy Baby" (Rodney Crowell, Will Jennings) – 3:06
"I Couldn't Leave You If I Tried" – 3:17
"She's Crazy for Leavin'" (Crowell, Guy Clark) – 3:16
"After All This Time" – 4:28
"I Know You're Married" – 3:31
"Above and Beyond" (Harlan Howard) – 2:28
"It's Such a Small World" – 3:21
duet with Rosanne Cash
"I Didn't Know I Could Lose You" – 3:21
"Brand New Rag" (Crowell, Jennings) – 3:07
"The Last Waltz" (Crowell, Jennings) – 5:21
"I've Got My Pride but I Got to Feed the Kids" – 2:28A
"It's Lonely Out" – 3:40A
"Lies Don't Lie" – 3:04A

AOnly included on Legacy re-issue.

Personnel
Eddie Bayers – drums
Barry Beckett – piano, organ
Rosanne Cash – background vocals
Rodney Crowell – lead vocals, acoustic guitar
Glen Duncan – fiddle
Paul Franklin – steel guitar
Vince Gill – background vocals
Russ Kunkel – drums
Mark O'Connor – fiddle, mandolin
Michael Rhodes – bass guitar
Vince Santoro – background vocals
Preston Smith – harmonica, background vocals
Steuart Smith – electric guitar

Charts

Weekly charts

Year-end charts

References

1988 albums
Rodney Crowell albums
Columbia Records albums
Albums produced by Tony Brown (record producer)
Albums produced by Rodney Crowell